Rumigny may refer to:
 Rumigny, Ardennes, a commune in France
 Rumigny, Somme, a commune in France